Raja Raisal, reigned 1584 to 1614, He married Chauhan Rajput Princess Kisnavati Nirban, the only daughter of Raja Peetha Nirban of Khandela and thus, was also the 1st Shekhawat Raja of Khandela. Son of Maharao Suja of Amarsar, was granted the estate (jagir) of 7 villages in Lamiya on death of his father, thereupon he joined Imperial Service at Delhi where he was granted the title of "Raja" also a title of "Darbari" and a Mansab of 1250 sawars which was later raised to 3000 by Emperor Akbar. He died about 1614 in South India. He was great-grandson of MahaRao Shekha, King of Amarsar and he belonged to the Kachwaha Clan of Amber/Jaipur Royal Family. The Shekhawats ruled over the Shekhawati region for over 500 years and are honoured with the hereditary title of "Tazimi Sirdars", whom the Maharaja of Jaipur receives by rising from his seat.

Progeny

Maharao Shekha, the ruler of Amarsar, son of Rao Mokal of Amber Royal Family and his Queen, a Nirban Chauhan Princess of Khetri.
Maharao Raimal, (by Rani Chauhan ji, daughter of Rao Sheobramha of Chobara Alwar), the ruler of Amarsar.
Maharao Suja, the ruler of Amarsar.
Rao Lunkaran, the ruler of Amarsar.
Raja Raisal Darbari (1st Shekhawat Raja of Khandela), 2nd son of Rao Suja Ji (by Rani Ratan Kunwari Rathore) born 1595 V.S.; received small 7 village Jagir of Lamiya from paternal state Amarsar. He got associated with Badshah Akbar and managed the security of his Royal Palace with 500 Rajput soldiers under him. He fought various battles under him including Sarnal, Kherabad and Patan. [Akbarnama, page 333, 382, 416] He was awarded the Title of RAJA by Akbar and had a Mansabdari of 3000. [Aine Akbari (Eng) page 462] He conquered the 4 parganas of Khandela, Udaipur(vati), Raiwasa and Kasli from Nirbans and Chandels, and they were recognised by Akbar as his Watan Jagir (Hereditary Personal State). Other than that he also had Jagirs of Mansab. He married and had issue, 12 sons, of whom 7 continued his lineage, and are called "Raisalot Shekhawats".
 Rajkumar Ladkhan or Lada or Lal Singh, ancestor of the "Ladkhani" sept of the Shekhawat sub-clan of Rewasa, Khachariawas, Ramgadh, Lamiya, Bajyawas, Dhingpur; Lalsari, Bardwa, Hudeel (in maroth); Tarapur, Khuri, Niradhanu, Khoru, Khatu(shyamji) were their Jagirs.
 Raja Hariram Ji (Yuvraj of Khandela) – He was the elder son of Rajkumari Kisnavati, only daughter of Raja Peetha Nirban of Khandela; he married and had issue, six sons. Thikanas of Mundru, Dadiya, Jethi, Lasadiya, Abhawas, etc. Khandela was usurped from his widows and children by his step-brother Girdhardas.
 Rajkumar Termal (Rao Tirmal) granted title of Rao, and the parganas of Nagore and Kasli (+84 villages); ancestor of ‘Rao ji Ka’ Sept of Shekhawats.
 Rajkumar Bhojraj (Rao Bhojraj) – born 1624 VS, later became Mansabdar as ruler of Udaiur(vati) pargana, 45 villages and also Ketri, Surajgadh, Bissau, Nawalgadh, Mandawra, Harduja, Mehi, Methoi, Kari, Ikhtiarpura, Pabana, Sakhoo; Chanwra, Mau, Jalpali, Nangal, Bhim, Puspuria, Dhani; Mukandgarh, Mahansar, Chokri, Malsisar, Alsisar, Nawalgarh, Baloda (Pilani) Mandawa, Sarwari, and Sikar; ancestor of Bhojraj Ji Ka sept of Shekhawat sub-clan.
 Rajkumar Parshuram (Parasram/Puras Ram) of Bae.
 Rajkumar Tejsi (Kunwar Tajsi or Tej Singh) - he died sp.
 Raja Girdhardas (Raja Girdhar Singh), 7th son of Raja Raisal, usurped Khandela from step-brother's kins. Danta, Khood are also their thikanas.
 Rajkumar Bihari - the younger son of Rani Kisnavati, he died childless in battle.
 Rajkumar Veerbhan - died in battle.
 Rajkumar Kusla (Kushala) - died in battle.
 Rajkumar Dayaldas - died childless.
 Rajkumar Babu (of Khawas) - died in battle.
 Rao Gangaram of Kasli, died at Renwal.
 Rani Laadi Kanwar Ji Sahiba, married Rao Amar Singh Rathore of Nagour, son of Maharaja Gaj Singh I of  Jodhpur. She became sati 26 July 1644.

References

External links
Shekhawat dynasty, Indian Princely States, Genealogical Gleanings Royal and Noble Lineages.

See also
Shekhawat
Shekhawati
Thikanas of Shekhawati
Khandela

History of Rajasthan
Khandela, Raisal